The 9th annual Genie Awards were held March 22, 1988, and honoured Canadian films released in 1987. The ceremony was held at the Metro Toronto Convention Centre and was co-hosted by Megan Follows and Gordon Pinsent.

The awards were dominated by Night Zoo (Un zoo la nuit), which won a still unmatched thirteen awards. The film garnered 14 nominations overall; the film's only nomination that failed to translate into a win was Gilles Maheu's nod for Best Actor, as he lost to the film's other Best Actor nominee, Roger Lebel. The female acting awards were won by Sheila McCarthy and Paule Baillargeon for the film I've Heard the Mermaids Singing, the only other narrative feature film to win any Genie awards that year; only the Documentary and Short Film awards, in which neither Night Zoo nor I've Heard the Mermaids Singing were even eligible for consideration, were won by any other film.

Winners and nominees

References

09
Genie
Genie
Genie